In mathematics, the explicit formulae for L-functions are relations between sums  over the complex number zeroes of an L-function and sums over prime powers, introduced  by   for the Riemann zeta function.  Such explicit formulae have been applied also to questions on bounding the discriminant of an algebraic number field, and the conductor of a number field.

Riemann's explicit formula
In his 1859 paper "On the Number of Primes Less Than a Given Magnitude" Riemann sketched an explicit formula (it was not fully proven until 1895 by von Mangoldt, see below) for the normalized prime-counting function  which is related to the prime-counting function  by

which takes the arithmetic mean of the limit from the left and the limit from the right at discontinuities. His formula was given in terms of the related function

The normalized prime-counting function can be recovered from this function by

where  is the Möbius function. Riemann's formula is then

involving a sum over the non-trivial zeros  of the Riemann zeta function. The sum is not absolutely convergent, but may be evaluated by taking the zeros in order of the absolute value of their imaginary part. The function  occurring in the first term is the (unoffset) logarithmic integral function given by the Cauchy principal value of the divergent integral

This formula says that the zeros of the Riemann zeta function control the oscillations of primes around their "expected" positions. (For graphs of the sums of the first few terms of this series see .)

The first rigorous proof of the aforementioned formula was given by von Mangoldt in 1895: it started with a proof of the following formula for the Chebyshev's function   

where the LHS is an inverse Mellin transform with

and the RHS is obtained from the residue theorem, and then converting it into the formula that Riemann himself actually sketched.

This series is also conditionally convergent and the sum over zeroes should again be taken in increasing order of imaginary part:
  where  

Weil's explicit formula 
There are several slightly different ways to state the explicit formula. André Weil's form of the explicit formula states

where
ρ runs over the non-trivial zeros of the zeta function
p runs over positive primes
m runs over positive integers
F is a smooth function all of whose derivatives are rapidly decreasing
 is a Fourier transform of F: 

, where  is the digamma function .

Roughly speaking, the explicit formula says the Fourier transform of the zeros of the zeta function is the set of prime powers  plus some elementary factors. Once this is said, the formula comes from the fact that the Fourier transform is a unitary operator, so that a scalar product in time domain is equal to the scalar product of the Fourier transforms in the frequency domain.

The terms in the formula arise in the following way.
The left-hand side is a sum over all zeros of ζ * counted with multiplicities, so the poles at 0 and 1 are counted as zeros of order −1.

Weil's explicit formula can be understood like this. The target is to be able to write that:

 

where  is the von Mangoldt function.

So that the Fourier transform of the non trivial zeros is equal to the primes power symmetrized  plus a minor term. Of course, the sum involved are not convergent, but the trick is to use the unitary property of Fourier transform which is that it preserves scalar product:

 

At a first look, it seems to be a formula for functions only, but in fact in many cases it also works when   is a distribution. Hence, by setting  where  is the Dirac delta, and carefully choosing a function  and its Fourier transform, we get the formula above.

Explicit formulae for other arithmetical functions

The Riemann-Weyl formula can be generalized to arithmetical functions other than the von Mangoldt function. For example for the Möbius function we have

 

Also for the Liouville function  we have

 

For the Euler-Phi function the explicit formula reads

 

In all cases the sum is related to the imaginary part of the Riemann zeros  and the function h is related to the test function g by a Fourier transform, .

For the divisor function of zeroth order .

Using a test function of the form  for some positive a turns the Poisson summation formula into a formula involving the Mellin transform. Here y is a real parameter.

Generalizations

The Riemann zeta function can be replaced by a Dirichlet L-function of a Dirichlet character χ. The sum over prime powers then gets extra
factors of χ(p m), and the terms Φ(1) and Φ(0) disappear because the L-series has no poles.

More generally, the Riemann zeta function and the L-series can be replaced by the Dedekind zeta function of an algebraic number field or a Hecke L-series. The sum over primes then gets replaced by a sum over prime ideals.

Applications
Riemann's original use of the explicit formula was to give an exact formula for the number of primes less than a given number. To do this, take F(log(y)) to be y1/2/log(y) for 0 ≤ y ≤ x and 0 elsewhere. Then the main term of the sum on the right is the number of primes less than x. The main term on the left is Φ(1); which turns out to be the dominant terms of the prime number theorem, and the main correction is the sum over non-trivial zeros of the zeta function. (There is a minor technical problem in using this case, in that the function F does not satisfy the smoothness condition.)

Hilbert–Pólya conjecture
According to the Hilbert–Pólya conjecture,  the complex zeroes ρ should be the eigenvalues of some linear operator T. The sum over the zeros of the explicit formula is then (at least formally) given by a trace:

More recent work by Alain Connes has gone much further into the functional-analytic background, providing a trace formula the validity of which is equivalent to such a generalized Riemann hypothesis.

See also
Selberg trace formula
Selberg zeta function

Footnotes

References

 Garcia J.J  Mellin Convolution and its Extensions, Perron Formula and Explicit Formulae doi=10.20944/preprints201801.0020.v1
 https://encyclopediaofmath.org/wiki/M%C3%B6bius_function#:~:text=The%20M%C3%B6bius%20function%20is%20an,M%C3%B6bius%20in%201832

Further reading
  
 

Zeta and L-functions